Stade de Mata Utu, also Stade de Kafika is a multi-use stadium in Mata Utu, Wallis Island, Wallis and Futuna. It is currently used mostly for football matches.  The stadium holds 1,500 people.

References

Football venues in Wallis and Futuna
Athletics (track and field) venues in Wallis and Futuna
Wallis and Futuna national football team
Mata-Utu